Confessions of an Heiress: A Tongue-in-Chic Peek Behind the Pose is a 2004 book co-written by Paris Hilton and Merle Ginsberg. It includes full color photographs of Hilton by Jeff Vespa, and gives her advice on the life as an heiress. For example, she advises her readers to "act ditsy" and wear tiaras.

A review in The Vancouver Sun suggested, "The book's underlying message (which is that you should be confident, individual and able to laugh at yourself) is actually quite sweet." Another review in The Sacramento Bee called it "an easy, hilarious read."

The book became a New York Times bestseller.

Publication history
 Simon & Schuster (2004) :

References

Books by Paris Hilton
American autobiographies
2004 non-fiction books
Collaborative non-fiction books